House at 1413 Lafayette St. is a historic home located at Lexington, Lafayette County, Missouri.  It was built about 1840, and is a -story, side passage plan, Greek Revival style brick I-house. It has a one-story rear ell. It features an impressive entry with transom and sidelights, a parapet gable roof, and segmental arched windows on the rear wing.

It was listed on the National Register of Historic Places in 1999.

References

Houses on the National Register of Historic Places in Missouri
Greek Revival houses in Missouri
Houses completed in 1840
Houses in Lafayette County, Missouri
National Register of Historic Places in Lafayette County, Missouri